This is a very incomplete list of Gaelic footballers who have played for Derry in the All-Ireland Senior Football Championship (SFC).

For a list of all Derry players with a Wikipedia article, see :Category:Derry inter-county Gaelic footballers. For the current Derry panel, see here.

List of players
Table headers
 Apps – Number of Championship games played

Additions
The following can be merged with the above.

References

External links
Official Derry GAA website

County Londonderry-related lists
Players
 
Lists of inter-county Gaelic football players